I Think You've Gone Mad (Or the Sins of the Father) is the third studio album by Toronto rapper and producer Sean Leon. It was released by The IXXI Initiative on February 5, 2017. The album also features collaborations with Daniel Caesar and the deceased Canadian rapper Redway. It was produced by Leon and many producers, such as WondaGurl, Eestbound, Jordan Evans and others.

The album received generally positive reviews from critics. The album was supported by six singles, "81", "Europe Freestyle / I Made It / Debt & Vendettas (featuring Savannah Ré)", "Deep End", "Matthew in The Middle (featuring Daniel Caesar)", "Killin' Mind" and "Fav Rapper / Hundred Million Religion"

Music and lyrics 
I Think You've Gone Mad (Or the Sins of the Father) contains lyrics about complicated relationships and trust issues with family, depression about his brother's imprisonment in his song "Matthew in The Middle" featuring Daniel Caesar, which was also featured on the compilation of the TV series Insecure. Here, Leon raps We ain't talk much since '99 / We have problems, 99 / "I'm comin' home", I know he lyin' / But that's my brother, so that was fine. In the album, Sean also shares his journey and express deeply about his daughter Xylo on the song "Xylo's Lullaby / Sweet Girls Always Fall for the Monsters". You know what they gon' say bout Daddy / You know that's-, "It ain't true" / Don't be terrified / I'll be fighting till the day I die, don't be terrified says Matthew.

Track listing

Sample credits
"Daughter (Hailey-Nirvana)" and "The Drowning Man" contains a sample of "Que Le Den Candela" by Celia Cruz
"Matthew In The Middle" contains a sample of "Devil in a New Dress" by Kanye West, featuring Rick Ross.
"Win" contains vocals of "Waves" by River Tiber.
"Hey Pretty Girl with the Dirty Mouth II" contains a sample of "Knocked Up" by Kings Of Leon.

Personnel
Album credits adapted from SoundCloud.

Musicians

 Sean Leon - Vocals, production and sequencing
 Daniel Caesar – Vocals 
 Rachel Piscione – Additional Vocals 
 Jack Rochon – Harmonizer  Guitar 
 Jordan Evans - Production 
 Jordan Fall - Sequencing 
 WondaGurl – Production 
 Eestbound – Production 
 Ethan Ashby - Sequencing  Additional Production 
 a l l i e – Additional Vocals 
 Bijan Amir - Production 
 Ben Foran - Guitar 
 Dragan Maricic - Guitar 
 Austin Jones - Trumpet 
 Aaron Cheung - Violin 
 Yogi - Production 
 Redway - Vocals 
 J'vell Boyce - Production  Drums 
 Julien Bowry - Additional Vocals 
 MADEAT2AM - Production 
 Tania Peralta - Additional Vocals

References

2017 albums
Sean Leon albums